Cutzamala de Pinzón  is one of the 81 municipalities of Guerrero, in south-western Mexico. The municipal seat lies at Cutzamala de Pinzón. The municipality covers an area of 611.1 km2.

As of 2005, the municipality had a total population of 20,730.

Demographics 
As of the 2020 census, the population of the municipality was 21,388. The 5 largest towns in order of population are:

References 

Municipalities of Guerrero